Arundel is  a township municipality in Quebec, Canada, located  south of Mont Tremblant.

Arundel was settled by Scottish and Irish immigrants in the mid-19th century who established subsistence farming operations and worked the forests in winter.

Today most of the land is reserved for agricultural use despite strong growth in the region. Much of Arundel borders the Rouge River.

Demographics 

Population trend:
 Population in 2021: 578 (2016 to 2021 population change: 2.7%)
 Population in 2016: 563
 Population in 2011: 604
 Population in 2006: 601
 Population in 2001: 555
 Population in 1996: 533
 Population in 1991: 555

Private dwellings occupied by usual residents: 290 (total dwellings: 402)

Mother tongue:
 French as first language: 44%
 English as first language: 54%
 Other as first language: 2%

Education
Sir Wilfrid Laurier School Board is the English-language school board of the town. Schools serving the town:
 Arundel Elementary School
 Sainte Agathe Academy (for high school only) in Sainte-Agathe-des-Monts

References

External links
Canton Arundel Website
Tweedsmuir Village History
Laurentian regional website
Historic Knox Church
 Rouge River Valley

Township municipalities in Quebec
Incorporated places in Laurentides